An Evening Wasted with Tom Lehrer is an album recorded by Tom Lehrer, the well-known satirist and Harvard lecturer. The recording was made on March 20–21, 1959 in Sanders Theater at Harvard.

In 2020, Lehrer donated all of his lyrics and music written by him to the public domain. He followed this on November 1, 2022 with all recording and performing rights of any kind, making all of his music that he has originally composed or performed free for anyone to use.

Track listing
"Poisoning Pigeons in the Park" – 2:38
"Bright College Days" – 3:03
"A Christmas Carol" – 2:54
"The Elements" – 2:16
"Oedipus Rex" – 3:41
"In Old Mexico" – 6:26
"Clementine" – 4:40
"It Makes a Fellow Proud to Be a Soldier" – 4:50
"She's My Girl" – 2:53
"The Masochism Tango" – 3:30
"We Will All Go Together When We Go" – 5:32

Songs' sources

"Poisoning Pigeons in the Park"
The lyrics refer to killing pigeons with cyanide-coated peanuts and strychnine-treated corn. The latter method was used by the United States Fish and Wildlife Service to control pigeon populations in Boston public areas during the 1950s. The pianist hired for the studio-recorded album, More of Tom Lehrer, fell off his bench when he heard the title.

"Bright College Days"
This song borrows heavily from "The Whiffenpoof Song", the traditional signature song of the Yale Whiffenpoofs.

"The Elements"

 
The lyrics of "The Elements" are a recitation of the names of all the chemical elements that were known at the time of writing, up to number 102, nobelium. It can be found on his albums Songs & More Songs by Tom Lehrer as well as An Evening Wasted with Tom Lehrer. The song is sung to the tune of Sir Arthur Sullivan's "Major General's Song" ("I am the very model of a modern major-general...") from The Pirates of Penzance.  Since that time, 16 more have been discovered. At his concert in Copenhagen (1967), Lehrer admitted, "I like to play this song every once in a while, just to see if I can still do it!" Indeed, several of Lehrer's fans, such as actor Daniel Radcliffe, have tried and failed to sing it. That is, he sang it in its entirety, but with slight hiccups. At some concerts he also played a version he claims is based on Aristotle's elements: "There's earth and air and fire and water."

"Oedipus Rex"
Lehrer comments that most popular movies of the time have a catchy title song that helps to draw in audiences. Believing that a recent (1957) film adaptation of Sophocles' play Oedipus Rex had failed at the box office because it did not have such a song, he wrote this one in ragtime style. It was also a reference to the popularity of Freudian psychoanalysis and the Oedipus complex in popular culture in the 1940s and 1950 in the United States.

"In Old Mexico"
This song is prefaced by a lengthy commentary about the (fictional) Dr. Samuel Gall, who gained fame and fortune from his "invention" of the gallbladder. Performed in the style of Mexican folk music, it describes the narrator's memory of a trip to that country and his viewing of a bullfight. The lyrics refer to three famous Spanish bullfighters, Belmonte, Dominguín, and Manolete, and also include a pejorative reference to Mexico as "the land of the wetback."

"Clementine"
"Clementine" is a parody of the old folk song "Oh My Darling, Clementine" as it might have turned out had it had been written by various composers in widely different styles of music. The first verse was in the style of Cole Porter (suggestive of "Night and Day"); the second verse an aria for baritone in the style of Mozart "or one of that crowd"; the third verse in the style of the Beatnik "Cool School" (suggestive of Thelonious Monk's "52nd Street Theme"); and the rousing finale was, in Lehrer's paraphrase of Shakespeare, "full of words and music, and signifying nothing," in the style of Gilbert and Sullivan (suggestive of "My name is John Wellington Wells" or other patter songs). Lehrer's argument for rewriting the song is that folk songs in general are "so atrocious, because they're written 'by the people'," and that the original "Clementine" has "no recognizable merit whatsoever."

"It Makes a Fellow Proud to Be a Soldier"
A parody of the official songs in use by the various branches of the United States military. Lehrer explains that the Army "didn't have no official song" when he started basic training; he wrote this one in an attempt to remedy the situation. (The branch adopted "The Army Goes Rolling Along" as its song in 1956, one year after Lehrer enlisted.)

One of the rare parodies of Lehrer's work emerged in Jim Bouton's classic book Ball Four: "It Makes a Fellow Proud to be an Astro", conjured up by members of the 1969 Houston Astros.

Notes 

Tom Lehrer albums
1959 live albums
Reprise Records live albums
Warner Records live albums
Satirical works
1950s comedy albums
Live comedy albums
Albums free for download by copyright owner